Ballıqaya (also, Ballykaya) is a village in the Qubadli Rayon of Azerbaijan.
Ballıqaya is the Azeri village in Qubadli

References 

Populated places in Qubadli District